Catena is a monotypic genus of flies in the family Tachinidae.

Species
Catena serena (Richter, 1972)

Distribution
Mongolia.

References

Exoristinae
Tachinidae genera
Diptera of Asia
Endemic fauna of Mongolia
Monotypic insect genera
Monotypic Brachycera genera